This is a list of mayors of Greensboro since 1859 when the current system of electing mayors replaced the intendant of police.

List of mayors

See also
 Timeline of Greensboro, North Carolina

References

Greensboro, North Carolina